Microdrillia circumvertens is a species of sea snail, a marine gastropod mollusk in the family Borsoniidae.

Description
The height of the small, milky-white shell attains 6 mm, its width 2.25 mm. It has an ovate-fusiform shape. It contains 8 whorls. The body whorl is bicarinate. A very beautiful spirally carinate and lirate species. The short canal and wide sinus proclaim it rightly placed in Microdrillia and the acute carinae are peculiar. The aperture is oblique and oblong. The columella contains no plications.

Distribution
This marine species occurs from the Gulf of Oman to Transkei, South Africa

References

External links
  Bouchet P., Kantor Yu.I., Sysoev A. & Puillandre N. (2011) A new operational classification of the Conoidea. Journal of Molluscan Studies 77: 273–308

circumvertens
Gastropods described in 1901